Agnel Gomes (born 14 October 1988) is an Indian footballer who plays as a goalkeeper for Sporting Clube de Goa in the I-League.

Career

Sporting Goa
Agnel made his debut for Sporting Goa in the I-League on 8 December 2012 against ONGC at the Ambedkar Stadium Sporting Goa drew that match 2–2 against ONGC and Agnel was in starting 11 because of injury to Ashok Singh and Gerard D'mello

Career statistics

Club
Statistics accurate as of 11 May 2013

References

http://www.goal.com/en-india/people/india/84725/agnel-gomes

Indian footballers
1988 births
Living people
I-League players
Sporting Clube de Goa players
Association football goalkeepers
Footballers from Goa